Qikiqtania (pronounced "kick-kiq-tani-ahh") is an extinct genus of elpistostegalian tetrapodomorph from the Late Devonian (early Frasnian stage) Fram Formation of Nunavut, Canada. The genus contains a single species, Q. wakei, known from a partial skeleton. Analysis of the fin bones suggests that Qikiqtania was well-suited to swimming, and likely incapable of walking or supporting itself out of the water, as has been suggested for the closely related Tiktaalik.

Discovery and naming 

The holotype specimen of Qikiqtania, NUFV 137, was discovered in 2004 in layers of the late Devonian (Frasnian)-dated Fram Formation of southern Ellesmere Island, Nunavut, Canada. The holotype specimen consists of lower jaws, partial left upper jaw and palate, gulars, ceratohyals, an articulated left pectoral fin and various articulated scales.

In 2022, Thomas A. Stewart, Justin B. Lemberg, Ailis Daly, Edward B. Daeschler, and Neil H. Shubin named and described Qikiqtania wakei based on these remains. The generic name, "Qikiqtania," is derived from the Inuktitut words "Qikiqtaaluk" and "Qikiqtani", which represent the traditional names for the fossil site. The specific name, "wakei," honors the evolutionary biologist David Wake.

Description
Qikiqtania had strong jaws that would have allowed it to securely bite and hold prey. It had a row of teeth and fangs inside its mouth, and it would have drawn food into its mouth using suction.

CT scans of the rock containing the fin revealed a complete limb inside. These scans allowed the describing authors to better understand and interpret the fossil material. The fin bones of Qikiqtania were not sturdy enough to support its body on land, so it would have lived entirely in the water. Its humerus does not show any indication of the well-developed muscle-attachment points seen in related semi-subaerial taxa. This is in contrast to Tiktaalik, which would have been able to prop itself up in shallow water or on land and use its limbs for support.

The preserved scales are rhomboid in shape, generally similar to those of other finned elpistostegalians. Preserved scales have been found from the trunk, including the dorsal midline and flank, the pectoral fin, and the lateral line series. Analysis of the scales revealed sensory canals that would have permitted the animal to detect the flow of water around its body.

Classification 
Qikiqtania represents an elpistostegalian closely related to limbed tetrapods. In all phylogenetic analyses, it was recovered as crownward to Panderichthys. The cladogram below displays the results of the phylogenetic analyses by Stewart et al. (2022):

References

Devonian fish of North America
Elpistostegalians
Fossil taxa described in 2022
Late Devonian animals
Paleozoic life of Nunavut
Prehistoric lobe-finned fish genera
Taxa named by Neil Shubin
Taxa named by Ted Daeschler